Hermenegildo de Albuquerque Portocarrero, Baron of Forte de Coimbra was a Brazilian Marshal and Baron. He was known for being the primary commander of the Invasion of Corumbá during the Mato Grosso Campaign of the Paraguayan War.

Biography
Born in Recife, Pernambuco, Hermenegildo was the son of Luís da Costa Ferreira and Ana Teodora Pita Portocarrero de Melo e Albuquerque. He began his military career, at the age of eighteen, on January 28, 1836.

However the fort was surrounded by a force of 5,000 Paraguayan infantry, transported in ten ships by Colonel Vicente Barrios at Asunción. Portocarrero was given an ultimatum to surrender but he refused, stating that he would fight to the last cartridge, despite the inferiority of men and weapons. The garrison of the fort of only 115 men, while in the entirety of the Province of Mato Grosso, there was less than 875.

After two days and a night of incessant bombardment, and unable to face the enemy forces, the small garrison, protected by darkness, abandoned the fort and boarded the speedboat Amambaí, which went to Cuiabá.

Hermenegildo himself broke the news of the invasion of the fort on January 6, 1865, to the governor of the province .

Portocarrero was promoted to lieutenant colonel and together with all available soldiers and the determination of the governor of the province, went to Colina do Melgaço, located on the left bank of the Cuiabá River, 165 kilometers from the capital, to avoid the arrival of Paraguayan ships to Cuiabá, which was successfully done.

Portocarrero was then made a baron on July 13, 1889.

He died at age 75, as a Marshal at Rio de Janeiro. He was the commander of the defunct Coast Artillery of the Brazilian Army. He was married to Ludovina Portocarrero (1825-1912), with whom he had fifteen children. Among his descendants, the actress Tônia Carrero was the most notable of them.

References

1818 births
1893 deaths
Marshals of Brazil
Brazilian military personnel of the Paraguayan War
People from Recife
Brazilian nobility